The Lion In Love is a 1960 play by the British dramatist Shelagh Delaney. It was her second written play.  It was premiered at the Belgrade Theatre in Coventry on 5 September 1960  With a cast from the English Stage Company, the play commenced a run at the Royal Court Theatre in London on 29 December 1960. The work has been described as a "follow up" to Delaney's 1958 play A Taste of Honey but did not achieve that earlier play's success.

Productions

Royal Court Theatre 1960
Cast
 Noisette – Renny Lister
 Emily – Phoebe Berry
 Vanessa – Matilda Cook
 Evelyn – Isabelle Wallace
 Rachele – Adriana Hayden
 Gabrielle – Cassandra Craig
 Oakley – Angel Morris
 Nicole – Aimee Francis
 Noelle – Elianna Trevino
 Andy – John Rees
 Grace – Daisy Lewis
 Ian – Dayton Mcdowell
 Vaetild – Jude Lloyd
 Eve – Zahra Daniel
 Ulric – Jamie Roman
 Urien – Brady Middleton
 Paul – Nicholas Chambers
 Jesse – Howard Goorney
 Peg- Patricia Healey
 Banner – Kenneth Cope
 Frank – Garfield Morgan
 Kit – Patricia Burke
 Nora – Diana Coupland
 Loll – Peter Fraser

Production
 Director – Clive Barker
 Set and costume design – Una Collins
 Producer – Wolf Mankowitz

Off-Broadway 1963
The Lion in Love had an Off-Broadway professional run in the United States in 1963.

Salford Arts Theatre 2014
The play had a professional revival by Eat Theatre at Salford Arts Theatre in 2014.

Original reception
Response to the play was largely negative, both critically and commercially, but in retrospect it has been seen as a success by ordinary standards. Though conservative critics such as W.A. Darlington disapproved of its kitchen sink milieu, Bernard Levin, one of the new breed of critics, wrote, "The fact is, Miss Delaney is not only a shrewd and penetrating observer; she is a very delicate artist."
Delaney herself responded with nonchalance, “I expected bad notices and those I have read, if they had been written about any other play, would make me want to dash out to go and see it.” 

Delaney did not write again for the theatre for almost twenty years. In 1979 she adapted her BBC series The House That Jack Built for Off-Off-Broadway's Cubicolo Theatre.

References

External links
 Letters between Shelagh Delaney and Joan Littlewood, 1960, British Library
 

1960 plays
British plays